"Goodness of God" is a song by Bethel Music and Jenn Johnson, which was released as the third single from Bethel Music's eleventh live album, Victory (2019), on November 1, 2019. The song was written by Ed Cash, Ben Fielding, Jason Ingram, Brian Johnson and Jenn Johnson. Ed Cash handled the production of the single.

"Goodness of God" peaked at No. 15 on the US Hot Christian Songs chart. The song was nominated for the 2020 GMA Dove Award for Worship Recorded Song of the Year.

The song was notably covered by CeCe Winans, who released her version of the song on her live album, Believe For It (2021). CeCe Winans' recording peaked at No. 6 on the Hot Christian Songs chart, and No. 3 on the Hot Gospel Songs chart. CeCe Winans' rendition of "Goodness of God" was nominated for the GMA Dove Award Contemporary Gospel Recorded Song of the Year at the 2022 GMA Dove Awards.

Background
"Goodness of God" was initially released by Bethel Music on January 4, 2019, as one of four promotional singles from Victory (2019), in the lead-up to its release which was slated for January 25, 2019. Jenn Johnson shared with Fox News that the song had been inspired by the process of adopting her fourth child, as she had been singing impromptu into her phone while driving on a long country road about the faithfulness and kindness of God. The song was then developed from the impromptu recording.

The radio version of "Goodness of God" was released in digital format on November 1, 2019. The song impacted Christian radio stations on November 8, 2019.

Bethel Music released an instrumental version of the song on their album, Without Words: Genesis, on November 15, 2019. On April 10, 2020, Bethel Music also released an alternate version of the song on their second studio album, Peace.

Composition
Johnson's vocal range spans from A♭3 to E♭5.

Accolades

Music videos
Bethel Music released the live music video of "Goodness of God" with Jenn Johnson leading the song during a worship service at Bethel Church through their YouTube channel on January 4, 2019. The lyric video of the song was released on January 25, 2019, on YouTube by Bethel Music.

Charts

Weekly charts

Year-end charts

Certifications

Release history

CeCe Winans version

CeCe Winans released a cover of the song on her live album Believe For It (2021). Winans' version of "Goodness of God" received a GMA Dove Award nomination for Gospel Worship Recorded Song of the Year at the 2022 GMA Dove Awards.

Accolades

Commercial performance
CeCe Winans's version of "Goodness of God" debuted at No. 22 on the Hot Gospel Songs chart dated May 7, 2022. The song also debuted number 45 on the US Hot Christian Songs chart dated May 14, 2022.

Music videos
On March 12, 2021, CeCe Winans released the audio video for the song.  The lyric video of the song was released on August 3, 2022, on YouTube by CeCe Winans. CeCe Winans released the official music video for "Goodness of God" through her YouTube channel on September 14, 2022.

Charts

Weekly charts

Year-end charts

Other versions
 Shane & Shane released their own rendition of "Goodness of God" on their album, The Worship Initiative, Vol. 17	 (2019).
 One Sonic Society released their cover of the song featuring Vertical Worship as a standalone single.
 Jason Ingram released his version of the song of part of his EP, Goodness of God (2020).
 North Point Worship released a double-sided single containing their own cover of the song.
 Rhett Walker and Essential Worship released their own version of the song as a standalone single.
 Triumphant Quartet released their Southern Gospel version of the song on their album, Bigger Than Sunday (2021).
 Israel & New Breed released their own cover of the song on their album, Feels Like Home, Vol. 2 (2021).
 We The Kingdom acoustic guitars and vocals cover with spontaneous additions. Uploaded Sept. 9, 2021. https://www.youtube.com/watch?v=qVEOJzAYIW4

References

External links
 on PraiseCharts

2019 singles
2019 songs
Bethel Music songs
CeCe Winans songs
Songs written by Ed Cash
Songs written by Jason Ingram